Blues on Purpose is a live album by jazz pianist Wynton Kelly recorded in 1965 and released on the Xanadu label featuring performances by Kelly with Paul Chambers and Jimmy Cobb recorded at the Half Note Club in New York City.

Reception
The Allmusic review by Scott Yanow states that "the recording quality is only so-so, but Kelly's consistently creative ideas... are enjoyable and swinging.

Track listing
All compositions by Wynton Kelly except as indicated
 "Blues on Purpose" (Rudy Stevenson) - 7:34 
 "If You Could See Me Now" (Tadd Dameron, Carl Sigman) - 6:19 
 "Somebody's Blues" - 9:52 
 "Another Blues" - 8:16 
 "Old Folks" (Dedette Lee Hill, Willard Robison) - 5:54 
 "Milestones" (Miles Davis) - 5:27 
Recorded at the Half Note, NYC on June 2 (tracks 2 & 4), July 25 (tracks 1 & 3) & August 17 (tracks 5 & 6), 1965

Personnel
Wynton Kelly - piano
Paul Chambers - bass
Jimmy Cobb - drums

References

1965 live albums
Xanadu Records live albums
Wynton Kelly albums